Ackerly meteorite is a meteorite of  found in 1995 in Ackerly, Texas, United States.

See also
 Glossary of meteoritics

References

1995 in the United States
1995 in science
Meteorites found in the United States
Geology of Texas